Each winner of the 1986 Governor General's Awards for Literary Merit was selected by a panel of judges administered by the Canada Council for the Arts.

The four Canada Council Children's Literature Prizes, two each for children's book writers and illustrators, were outside the Governor General's Awards program for the last time. For Children's Literature Prize winners 1975 to 1986, see "Children's literature" (2) and "Children's illustration" (2) in the footer navigation box.

Two awards for literary translation were also included, bringing the number of Governor General's Awards for Literary Merit from 8 in 1986 to 14 in 1987.

English

French

References

Governor General's Awards
Governor Generals Awards, 1986
Governor